Keranggas (also known as Kranggas) is a settlement and Iban longhouse in Sarawak, Malaysia.

The village is establishing electricity generation using micro hydroelectric weirs (low dams) to give a continuous supply.

In 2010, during the Gawai Dayak festivities, the village was visited by a wrinkled hornbill (Aceros corrugatus), an unusual occurrence.

Neighbouring settlements include:

References

Villages in Sarawak